The list of hoards in Ireland comprises the significant archaeological hoards of coins, jewellery, metal objects, scrap metal and other valuable items that have been discovered on the island of Ireland (Republic of Ireland and Northern Ireland). It includes both hoards that were buried with the intention of retrieval at a later date (personal hoards, founder's hoards, merchant's hoards, and hoards of loot), and also hoards of votive offerings which were not intended to be recovered at a later date, but excludes grave goods and single items found in isolation. The list is subdivided into sections according to archaeological and historical periods.

Neolithic hoards
The table below lists hoards that are dated to the Neolithic period, approximately 4500 to 2500 BC.

Bronze Age hoards
The table below list hoards that are associated with the Irish Copper and Bronze Ages, approximately 2500 BC to 700 BC.

Iron Age hoards
The table below list hoards that are associated with the Irish Iron Age, approximately 700 BC to 400 AD.

Roman hoards
The table below list hoards of Roman coins and silverware found in Ireland. There are very few Roman hoards in Ireland as it was never part of the Roman Empire, and those hoards that have been found are thought to have been looted from Britain by Irish raiders.

Early Medieval hoards
The table below lists hoards that are associated with the early medieval period, from the introduction of Christianity until the start of Anglo-Norman settlement, approximately 400 AD to 1100 AD.

Viking hoards
The table below lists hoards that are associated with the Viking culture in Ireland.

Medieval hoards
The table below lists hoards that date to the late medieval period, from 1066 to about 1500.

Post-Medieval hoards
The table below lists hoards that date to 1536 or later, following the reconquest of Ireland by Henry VIII of England. Most of these hoards date to the Elizabethan era (1558–1603), during which time the Nine Years' War (1594–1603) caused considerable instability throughout Ireland, but especially in Ulster.

See also

 List of hoards in Great Britain
 List of hoards in the Channel Islands
 List of hoards in the Isle of Man
 List of metal detecting finds

Footnotes

References
 

Hoards in Ireland
Hoards in Ireland
Treasure troves
Prehistoric Ireland
Ireland